Sir Robert Needham was an English politician who sat in the House of Commons  from 1645 to 1648.

Needham was the son of Thomas Needham of Pool Park and his wife Eleanor Bagenal, daughter of Sir Henry Bagenal and widow of Sir Robert Salisbury.  He was knighted on 4 June 1630.

In  September 1645, Needham was elected Member of Parliament for Haverfordwest. He was secluded from the Parliament in 1648 in Pride's Purge

Needham was married twice.

References

Year of birth missing
Year of death missing
Members of the Parliament of England (pre-1707) for constituencies in Wales
English MPs 1640–1648